Just Feels Good is the second studio album by American country music duo Thompson Square. It was released on March 26, 2013, via Stoney Creek Records. As with their first album, it was produced by New Voice Entertainment.

Background
On October 29, 2012, "If I Didn't Have You," was released as the lead-off single from Just Feels Good. For the chart dated May 11, 2013, it ascended to the top of the Billboard Country Airplay chart, becoming their second Number One hit. "Everything I Shouldn't Be Thinking About" was released as the album's second single on June 10, 2013. It became the duo's fourth Top Ten hit when it reached a peak of No. 4 on the Country Airplay chart in early 2014.

"Testing the Water" was released as the third single from the album in April 2014, although was pulled shortly after spending only a few weeks on the charts. "I Can't Outrun You," a song previously recorded by Trace Adkins on his 2008 album X, was issued as the album's fourth single.

Critical reception

Brian Mansfield of USA Today evoked how the "songs play like a rom-com with dual narrators. They've got all the elements — meet-cutes, separation, obstacles and a happy ending — plus a soundtrack that mixes '70s-rock guitar with mandolin and pedal steel." Conversely, Chuck Yarborough of The Plain Dealer called it an "autobiographical album" that "is just too dang slick, and that love becomes cloying instead of sweet." Tammy Ragusa of Country Weekly found that the album finds the duo "laughing in the face of fear" and in doing that have crafted a "palpable" work, which she suggest that the next album be called "Just Feels Better." Taste of Country's Billy Dukes affirmed that the album "would benefit from a wider range of experiences and production approaches. It’s an album jammed full of happy love songs that, even with creative interpretation, begins to lose an edge." This is because that "As a collection of songs, however, Thompson Square simply rely too much on one dimension", and suggest that having a "single song about death, dogs, tractors … anything, really, would be a great way to break up the sweet monotony." However, Got Country Online's Donna Block vowed that the album "is a testament to the strength of their relationship." Roughstock's Matt Bjorke suggested that the duo are "ready to up the ante" because "
Everything about Just Feels Good is better" that their debut effort, and he proclaimed that "more strong albums like Just Feels Good it's hard to see their run of hits ending anytime soon."

Commercial performance
The album debuted at number 13 on the US Billboard 200 and number 4 on the Billboard Top Country Albums chart, with first week sales of 36,000 copies.

Track listing

"What Am I Gonna Do (Daddy's Song)" was written in memory of Shawna's late father. Shawna sang solo in this song and does not have Keifer singing lead or background.

Personnel

Thompson Square
Keifer Thompson - vocals
Shawna Thompson - vocals

Additional Musicians
Kurt Allison - electric guitar
Jake Clayton - cello, violin
David Fanning - programming
Tony Harrell - accordion, Hammond B-3 organ, keyboards, piano
Mike Johnson - steel guitar
Tully Kennedy - bass guitar
Rob McNelley - electric guitar
Rich Redmond - drums, percussion
Jeff Roach - Hammond B-3 organ, keyboards, piano
Adam Shoenfeld - electric guitar
Ilya Toshinsky - banjo, acoustic guitar, mandolin, resonator guitar

Chart performance

Weekly charts

Year-end charts

Singles

References

2013 albums
Thompson Square albums
BBR Music Group albums
Albums produced by New Voice Entertainment